The Barraclough Shield is the trophy for interstate rugby union matches between the New South Wales Suburban and Queensland Suburban representative teams, colloquially known as "Subbies". The Barraclough Shield was first contested in 1966 and was named after Lindley John Forbes (John) Barraclough AM (1926-2005), a former New South Wales MP and stalwart of New South Wales Suburban Rugby.

History of the Barraclough Shield
As of 2020, New South Wales have won the Barraclough Shield on forty three occasions, Queensland  have won five, with three matches drawn. Recent matches have usually been played at Ballymore Stadium in Brisbane, but the match in the 50th year of Subbies Rugby in Queensland was played at Suncorp Stadium as the curtain-raiser to the Queensland Reds match against the British and Irish Lions.

List of winners since 1966:

See also

Rugby union in Australia
List of Australian club rugby union competitions

References

External links
 Barraclough Shield winners

Rugby union competitions in Australia
Recurring sporting events established in 1966
1966 establishments in Australia